The fulmars are tubenosed seabirds of the family Procellariidae.  The family includes two extant species and two extinct fossil species from the Miocene.

Fulmars superficially resemble gulls, but are readily distinguished by their flight on stiff wings, and their tube noses. They breed on cliffs, laying one or rarely two eggs on a ledge of bare rock or on a grassy cliff. Outside the breeding season, they are pelagic, feeding on fish, squid and shrimp in the open ocean. They are long-lived for birds, living for up to 40 years.

Historically, the northern fulmar lived on the Isle of St Kilda, where it was extensively hunted. The species has expanded its breeding range southwards to the coasts of England and northern France.

Taxonomy 
The genus Fulmarus was introduced in 1826 by the English naturalist James Stephens. The name comes from the Old Norse Fúlmár meaning "foul-mew" or "foul-gull" because of the birds' habit of ejecting a foul-smelling oil. The type species was designated by George Gray in 1855 as the northern fulmar .

As members of Procellaridae and then the order Procellariiformes, they share certain traits. First, they have nasal passages that attach to the upper bill called naricorns. The bills of Procellariiformes are unique in being split into between seven and nine horny plates. Finally, they produce a stomach oil made up of wax esters and triglycerides that is stored in the proventriculus. This can be sprayed out of their mouths as a defence against predators and as an energy rich food source for chicks and for the adults during their long flights. It will mat the plumage of avian predators, which can lead to their death. Fulmars have a salt gland that is situated above the nasal passage and helps desalinate their bodies, due to the high amount of ocean water that they imbibe. It excretes a strong saline solution from their nose.

Extant species
The genus contains the following two species.

Fossils
Two prehistoric species have been described from fossil bones found on the Pacific coast of California: Fulmarus miocaenus (Temblor Formation) and Fulmarus hammeri from the Miocene.

Description
The two fulmars are closely related seabirds occupying the same niche in different oceans. The northern fulmar (Fulmarus glacialis) or just fulmar lives in the North Atlantic and North Pacific, whereas the southern fulmar, (Fulmarus glacialoides) is, as its name implies, a bird of the Southern Ocean. These birds look superficially like gulls, but are not closely related, and are in fact petrels. The northern species is grey and white with a yellow bill,  in length with a  wingspan.

Behavior

Breeding

Both recent species breed on cliffs, laying a single white egg. Unlike many small to medium birds in the Procellariiformes, they are neither nocturnal breeders, nor do they use burrows; their eggs are laid on the bare rock or in shallow depressions lined with plant material.

In Britain, northern fulmars historically bred on St. Kilda (where their harvesting for oil, feathers and meat was central to the islands' economy). They spread into northern Scotland in the 19th century, and to the rest of the United Kingdom by 1930.  The expansion has continued further south; the fulmar can now often be seen in the English Channel and in France along the northern and western coasts, with breeding pairs or small colonies in Nord, Picardy, Normandy and along the Atlantic coast in Brittany.

Feeding

Fulmars are highly pelagic outside the breeding season, like most tubenoses, feeding on fish, small squid, shrimp, crustaceans, marine worms, and carrion. The range of these species increased greatly in the 20th century due to the availability of fish offal from commercial fleets, but may contract because of less food from this source and climatic change.  The population increase has been especially notable in the British Isles.

Like other petrels, their walking ability is limited, but they are strong fliers, with a stiff wing action quite unlike the gulls. They look bull-necked compared to gulls, and have short stubby bills. They are long-lived, the longest recorded lifespan for F. glacialis being 40 years, 10 months and 16 days.

Relationship with humans

Fulmars have for centuries been hunted for food. The engraver Thomas Bewick wrote in 1804 that "Pennant, speaking of those [birds] which breed on, or inhabit, the Isle of St Kilda, says—'No bird is of so much use to the islanders as this: the Fulmar supplies them with oil for their lamps, down for their beds, a delicacy for their tables, a balm for their wounds, and a medicine for their distempers. A photograph by George Washington Wilson taken about 1886 shows a "view of the men and women of St Kilda on the beach dividing up the catch of Fulmar". James Fisher, author of The Fulmar (1952) calculated that every person on St Kilda consumed over 100 fulmars each year; the meat was their staple food, and they caught around 12,000 birds annually. 

Fulmar eggs were collected until the late 1920s in the St Kilda islands by their men scaling the cliffs. The eggs were buried in St Kilda peat ash to be eaten through the cold, northern winters. The eggs were considered to taste like duck eggs in taste and nourishment.

However, when the human population left St Kilda in 1930, the fulmar population did not suddenly increase. 

Both the southern fulmar and the northern fulmar are listed as of Least Concern by the International Union for Conservation of Nature (IUCN).

Gallery

References

Sources
 
 
 
 
  See also more recent publication(s) with similar title.

Further reading

External links

Northern fulmar profile as part of BTO BirdFacts
Northern fulmar videos photos and sounds on the Internet Bird Collection
Southern fulmar videos photos and sounds on the Internet Bird Collection

Fulmarus
Seabirds
Taxa named by James Francis Stephens